Don't Mess with Bill is a 1980 Canadian short documentary film about Canadian martial arts pioneer Bill Underwood, produced by Pen Densham. It was nominated for an Academy Award for Best Documentary Short.

References

External links

1980 films
1980 documentary films
1980 short films
American short documentary films
1980s short documentary films
Martial arts films
1980s English-language films
1980s American films